

Climate 
Yevlakh has a semi-arid climate (Köppen climate classification: BSk).

Aran (previously known as İyirmi Səkkiz Aprel, 28 Aprel, and 28 Aprelya) is a village and the most populous municipality in the Yevlakh Rayon of Azerbaijan.  It has a population.7.263 nəf.

References 

Populated places in Yevlakh District